The DPR Korea Figure Skating Championships is a figure skating competition held annually to crown the national champions of North Korea. Figure skaters compete in the disciplines of men's singles, ladies' singles, pair skating, and ice dancing.

Medalists

Men

Ladies

Pairs

Ice dancing

External links
 
 
 

Figure skating national championships
Figure skating in North Korea